The Atlantic sturgeon (Acipenser oxyrinchus oxyrinchus) is a member of the family Acipenseridae and along with other sturgeon it is sometimes considered a living fossil. The Atlantic sturgeon is one of two subspecies of A. oxyrinchus, the other being the Gulf sturgeon (A. o. desotoi). The main range of the Atlantic sturgeon is in eastern North America, extending from New Brunswick, Canada, to the eastern coast of Florida, United States. A disjunct population occurs in the Baltic region of Europe (today only through a reintroduction project). The Atlantic sturgeon was in great abundance when the first European settlers came to North America, but has since declined due to overfishing, water pollution, and habitat impediments such as dams. It is considered threatened, endangered, and even locally extinct in many of its original habitats.

Physical appearance

Rather than having true scales, the Atlantic sturgeon has five rows of bony plates known as scutes. Its coloration ranges from bluish-black and olive green on its back to white on its underside. It has a longer snout than other sturgeons and has four barbels at the side of its mouth.

Lifecycle
Atlantic sturgeon under six years of age stay in the brackish water where they were born before moving into the ocean. In areas where shortnose sturgeon are also present, the adults of that species can be, and historically were for centuries, confused with immature Atlantic sturgeon. When mature, they travel upstream to spawn. The females may lay 800,000 to 3.75 million eggs in a single year, doing so every two to six years. After laying their eggs, females travel back downstream, but males may remain upstream after spawning until forced to return downstream by the increasingly cold water. They may even return to the ocean, where they stay near the coastline.

The species is also known for its occasional 'leaping' behavior, during which the fish will emerge completely out of the water in a forceful motion that can be hazardous to anything unlucky enough to be struck. The exact reason why sturgeon leap remains unknown, although some scholars believe leaping is a form of group communication. In one study, of a population of the species in the Suwannee river in northwestern Florida, leaping behavior was found to vary seasonally, with the highest frequency of occurrence in June.

Economic history
Originally, the Atlantic sturgeon was considered a worthless fish. Its rough skin would often rip nets, keeping fishermen from catching more profitable fish. Sturgeon were one of the types of fish harvested at the first North American commercial fishery, and were the first cash "crop" harvested in Jamestown, Virginia.  Other fisheries along the Atlantic coast harvested them for use as food, a leather material used in clothing and bookbinding, and isinglass, a gelatinous substance used in clarifying jellies, glues, wines and beer. However, the primary reason for catching sturgeon was the high-quality caviar that could be made cheaply from its eggs, called black gold by watermen. In the late 19th century, seven million pounds of sturgeon meat were exported from the US per year. Within years, however, that amount dropped to 22,000 pounds. The number later rose to about 200,000 pounds a year in the 1950s.

Conservation status
In February 2012, the Atlantic sturgeon was listed by the National Oceanic and Atmospheric Administration Fisheries Service under the Endangered Species Act (ESA). Four distinct population segments (DPSs) were listed as endangered (New York Bight, Chesapeake Bay, Carolina, and South Atlantic) while one DPS was listed as threatened (Gulf of Maine).<ref name=NMFS>NMFS. Endangered and Threatened Wildlife and Plants; Final Listing Determinations for Two Distinct Population Segments of Atlantic Sturgeon (Acipenser oxyrinchus oxyrinchus) in the Southeast.Federal Register;; v77, (February 6, 2012), 5914-5982.</ref>  As of this writing (July 22, 2015) there are concerns that the construction of the bridge to replace the Tappan Zee connecting Rockland County to Westchester County in New York, in the Hudson River, may impact the sturgeon's ecological stability.

The American Fisheries Society considers the fish as threatened throughout its entire range, although it is believed to no longer inhabit the full range it once did. In the Chesapeake watershed, the James River in Virginia is one of the last confirmed holdouts for that region's population. In May 2007, a survey captured 175 sturgeon in the river, with 15 specimens exceeding . A bounty-based survey of live Atlantic sturgeon in Maryland's portion of the bay found a high number of captures reported in 2005–06.

In 2016, the National Marine Fisheries Service considered designating sixteen rivers as endangered habitat, which would require more attention to be given to uses of the rivers that affect the fish. Then in 2018, NMFS actually mapped a total of thirty-one critical river habitats along the United States' Atlantic shores.

Baltic population
The now nearly extinct sturgeon population in the Baltic Sea area belongs to the Atlantic sturgeon A. oxyrinchus rather than to the European species A. sturio as had been thought.  A. oxyrinchus migrated to the Baltic about 1300 years ago and displaced the native A. sturio''.

The last known specimen of the Atlantic sturgeon in the Baltic region was caught in 1996 near Muhumaa in Estonia.

A German-Polish project was underway in 2009 to reintroduce the sturgeon into the Baltic by releasing specimens caught in the Canadian Saint John River into the Oder, a river at the border between Germany and Poland where the species once spawned. The project expanded in 2013 to include Estonia, where one-year-old juveniles were released into the Narva River.

Conservation designation
IUCN: Near Threatened

CITES: Appendix II

The American Fisheries Society considers it endangered in all stream systems except conservation-dependent in the Hudson, Delaware, and Altamaha Rivers.

The Atlantic sturgeon of the Delaware River are listed under the ESA as part of the New York Bight distinct population segment, which includes all Atlantic sturgeon that spawn in watersheds draining to coastal waters from Chatham, Massachusetts, to the Delaware-Maryland border on Fenwick Island. NMFS believes fewer than 300 spawning adults are in the Delaware River population; just over 100 years ago the estimated population was 180,000 spawning adult females.

Management
Atlantic sturgeon are now a threatened species. Management of the species is largely based on the restriction of fishing of the species. This helps limit fishing mortalities of sturgeon to bycatch.

References

Further reading

New York State Department of Environmental Conservation - New York's Sturgeon
https://web.archive.org/web/20060213083257/http://dep.state.ct.us/burnatr/wildlife/factshts/atsturg.htm
https://web.archive.org/web/20060508224855/http://www.maine.gov/dmr/recreational/fishes/sturgeon.htm

Burroughs, Frank [August 2006]. Confluence: Merrymeeting Bay. Gardiner, Maine: Tilbury House, 21-28. .

Atlantic sturgeon
Fish of the Atlantic Ocean
Fauna of the Eastern United States
Freshwater fish of the Southeastern United States
Taxa named by Samuel L. Mitchill
Atlantic sturgeon
ESA endangered species

fr:Acipenser oxyrinchus